The Stonehurst Family Farm and Motor Museum is a working farm and a motor museum located in the village of Mountsorrel, Leicestershire. The farm won the Leicestershire Tourism Award for Best visitor experience 2000/2001.

Farm

History
The farm (established in 1851) is currently open to the public daily and is home to many differing animals. The farm operates tractor trailer rides for the local children, currently hoping to link up with the Mountsorrel Railway creating a large linked family attraction. Stonehurst has a working farm with several interactive attractions.

Motor museum
The motor museum on the property has a large collection of vintage motorcycles and cars, including some 1960s sports cars.

Attractions
Wobbling bridges and balance beams
Petting zoo
 Motor museum
Tractor rides
Adventure trail
Pony rides

References

Amusement parks in England
Automobile museums in England
Borough of Charnwood
Farms in Leicestershire
Museums in Leicestershire